Jim Weidner (born December 1968) is an American politician from the U.S. state of Oregon. A Republican, he is a former member of the Oregon House of Representatives, representing Yamhill County in District 24 from 2009 until 2017.

References

Living people
People from McMinnville, Oregon
1968 births
Republican Party members of the Oregon House of Representatives
Businesspeople from Oregon
21st-century American politicians